"If I Was a River" is a song written by Diane Warren and included on the international version of Australian singer Tina Arena's fourth studio album, In Deep (1997). It is the second Warren song performed by Arena, following 1989's "Strong as Steel". The track was aimed at promoting In Deep in the United States. Lyrically, the song is a metaphoric declaration to a loved one, in which Tina Arena lists all the things she would do for them if she were various elements, planets or weather phenomena, including the titular river. The song was one of 10 singles released from the many incarnations of In Deep; overall, it was the album's seventh.

Released as the final single from the album in the United Kingdom, "If I Was a River" peaked at number 43 on the UK Singles Chart. In 2000, "If I Was a River" was released as a single in Japan, alongside four remixes of the track, commissioned for club play in the United States, where they were only made available on vinyl to disc-jockeys. The rarity of the Japanese release makes it a much sought-after item. The song was later included on the compilation albums Souvenirs and Greatest Hits 1994-2004.

Track listings
UK CD1
 "If I Was a River"
 "Any Other Love"
 "Chains"

UK CD2
 "If I Was a River" (long version)
 "Welcome to My World"
 "Stay"

Japanese CD single
 "If I Was a River" (album version)
 "If I Was a River" (7--inch vocal mix) 
 "If I Was a River" (Nikolas & Sibley Rising Dub)
 "If I Was a River" (Ny:pd radio edit)
 "If I Was a River" (Ny:pd club remix)

Personnel
 Tina Arena: lead vocals, background vocals
 Diane Warren: songwriter
 Walter Afanasieff: producer, arranger, keyboards, drum programming, synthesizers, Moog synth bass, Synclavier programming
 Dan Shea: additional keyboards, drum programming, synthesizer programming, MacIntosh programming
 Dean Parks: acoustic guitar
 Michael Landau, Michael Thompson: electric guitars
 Alex Brown, Jim Gilstrap, Lynn Davis, Phillip Ingram, Jeanie Tracy, Karen Brewington, Claytoven Richardson, Skyler Jett, Sandy Griffith: background vocals

Charts

Release history

References

Tina Arena songs
1997 songs
1998 singles
Columbia Records singles
Epic Records singles
Song recordings produced by Walter Afanasieff
Songs written by Diane Warren